The 1998 Country Music Association Awards, 32nd Ceremony, was held on September 23, 1998 at the Grand Ole Opry House, Nashville, Tennessee, and was hosted by CMA Award Winner, Vince Gill. Tim McGraw and George Strait went in to the night with 5 nominations each, including Entertainer of the Year. Steve Wariner led the night with 3 wins, including Song of the year.

Winners and nominees 
Winner are in Bold.

Hall Of Fame

References 

Country Music Association
CMA
Country Music Association Awards
Country Music Association Awards
Country Music Association Awards
Country Music Association Awards
20th century in Nashville, Tennessee
Events in Nashville, Tennessee